43rd Street may refer to:

43rd (CTA station), Chicago, Illinois
43rd Street (Manhattan), New York City